Voces8, styled VOCES8, is an a cappella octet from England. They have appeared internationally and made recordings of classical music, jazz, pop, and their own arrangements. Recent recordings are for Decca Classics and under their own label, Voces8 Records. Educational efforts are run by the Voces8 Foundation.

History 
VOCES8 is a British vocal ensemble originally founded in 2003, and regrouped in 2005, by brothers Paul and Barnaby Smith, both former choristers of Westminster Abbey. For most of its history, the ensemble has contained two sopranos, two countertenors, two tenors, a baritone and a bass. By 2018, one of the countertenors had been replaced by a female alto.

The ensemble has a diverse repertoire including early English and European Renaissance music, traditional folk song, classic jazz, pop and their own arrangements. They have appeared internationally, touring especially in Europe, Asia and North America.

VOCES8 has commissioned new works from composers including Ēriks Ešenvalds, Ola Gjeilo, Jonathan Dove, Jocelyn Hagen, Ken Burton, Roderick Williams, Alexander Levine, Roxanna Panufnik, Mårten Jansson and Ben Parry. Jim Clements is their arranger-in-residence .

The octet won the Limelight International Artist of the Year: People's Choice award at the 2021 Limelight Awards.

Their 2022 tour program was called Stardust, after a composition commissioned from Taylor Scott Davis.

Members

Current
 Andrea HainesFirst soprano (2008–present)
 Molly NoonSecond soprano (2021–present)
 Katie Jeffries-HarrisFirst alto (2018–present)
 Barnaby SmithSecond alto/countertenor & Artistic Director (2005–present)
 Blake MorganFirst tenor (2016–present)
 Euan WilliamsonSecond tenor (2019–present)
 Chris MooreBaritone (2018–present)
 Dominic CarverBass (2022–present)

Former
 Rachel MajorFirst soprano (2005–2008)
 Catherine BackhouseSecond soprano (2005–2009)
 Emily DickensSecond soprano (2009–2017)
 Eleonore CockerhamSecond soprano (2017–2021)
 Daniel Keating-RobertsFirst countertenor (2005–2007)
 Chris WardleFirst countertenor (2007–2018)
 Charles MacDougallFirst tenor (2005–2012)
 Oliver VincentFirst tenor (2012–2016)
 Thomas ElwinSecond tenor (2005–2006)
 Robin BaileySecond tenor (2006–2009)
 Robert Mingay SmithSecond tenor (2009–2013)
 Sam DresselSecond tenor (2013–2019)
 Paul SmithBaritone & Founder (2005–2016)
 Rob ClarkBaritone (2016–2018)
 Simon WhiteleyBass (2005)
 Greg HallamBass (2006)
 Dingle YandellBass (2006–2015)
 Jonathan PaceyBass (2015-2022)

Timeline

Lineup

VOCES8 Foundation 
The VOCES8 Foundation (formerly VCM Foundation) is a UK-registered charity, set up by VOCES8 founder members Paul and Barnaby Smith in 2006 to develop the ensemble's music education and outreach programmes. Awarded a Classic FM (UK) Public Choice Award at the 2020 Music & Drama Education Awards, the charity works across choral and small vocal ensemble performance and education and is based at the VOCES8 Centre at St Anne and St Agnes Church in the City of London.

Performance 
Foundation artists perform around 200 concerts each year, including through online/livestreaming.

Education 
Foundation artists reach up to 40,000 people a year in regular workshops and masterclasses with Music Hubs, schools and community groups. 
In 2015 the ensemble launched the VOCES8 Scholars Programme which provides training in performing, recording and workshop leading for 20 young singers with an interest in choral singing in the UK and USA.

In 2020 during the COVID-19 pandemic they launched the VOCES8 Digital Academy featuring tutorials, exercises, learning and performing tracks and videos.

Discography 
The group has recorded with Decca. They have also recorded with Signum, and their own Voces8 Records label. As part of their 15th anniversary celebrations in 2020, the group released their project After Silence, composed of four digital EPs.

Albums 
 Aces High (2010, Signum)
 Bach's Motets, with the Senesino Players (2010)
 Brahms, Bruckner, Reger (2011)
 In the Beginning (2012)
 Christmas (2012, Signum)
 A Choral Tapestry (2012, Signum)
 Where I Sleep (2014, Decca)
 Eventide (2014, Decca)
 Lux (2015, Decca)
 Winter (2016, Decca)
 Equinox (2018)
 Enchanted Isle (2019)
 After Silence (2020, Voces8 Records)
 Infinity (2021, Decca)

EPs 
 Voces8 EP (2019)

Collaborations 
 A Capella Collection (2012, Signum) – with other groups, marking 15 years of Signum Records
 Choral Collection (2012, Signum) – same
 Early Music Collection (2012, Signum) – same
 A Purcell Collection (2014, Signum) – by Voces8 and Les Inventions
 Psalms (2015, Signum) – works by Benedetto Marcello, Voces8 and Les Inventions
 Ola Gjeilo (2018, Decca) – works by Ola Gjeilo and Voces8
 Home Is (2018) – by Jacob Collier and Voces8
 Requiem Novum (2022) - by Martin Jansson, Voces 8, Apollo5, and the Philharmonia Orchestra
 The Lost Birds (2022) - by Christopher Tin, Voces8 and the Royal Philharmonic Orchestra

Music books
 A Cappella Songbook (2012, paperback) 
 A Cappella Songbook 2 (2018, paperback)

References

External links 

 
 
 Voces8 Foundation (official website)
 Voces8 (Vocal Ensemble) Bach cantatas website 2019
 Robert Hugill: Voces8 / Lux planethugill.com May 2015

Musical groups established in 2005
2005 establishments in the United Kingdom
Professional a cappella groups
British vocal groups